Major General James Maurice Hannan Bowder,  is a senior British Army officer. He currently serves as Director of Futures, at Army Command.

Military career
Following training at the Royal Military Academy Sandhurst, Bowder was commissioned into the Grenadier Guards on 13 April 1996. He became commanding officer of 1st Battalion, Grenadier Guards in 2011, in which role he was deployed to Afghanistan. He went on to be commander of the 1st Intelligence, Surveillance and Reconnaissance Brigade in June 2016, Head of Strategy for the Army in June 2018, and General Officer Commanding Force Troops Command in July 2019. Force Troops Command was renamed as 6th (United Kingdom) Division on 1 August 2019. He has been the Regimental Lieutenant Colonel of the Grenadier Guards since 18 June 2022, a ceremonial appointment.

References

|-

British Army major generals
Grenadier Guards officers
Living people
Officers of the Order of the British Empire
Recipients of the Commendation for Valuable Service
Year of birth missing (living people)